Hollywood Canteen is a 1944 American musical romantic comedy film starring Joan Leslie, Robert Hutton, Dane Clark and features many stars (appearing as themselves) in cameo roles. and produced by Warner Bros. The film was written and directed by Delmer Daves and received three Oscar nominations.

Plot
Two soldiers on leave spend three nights at the Hollywood Canteen before returning to active duty in the South Pacific. Slim Green (Robert Hutton) is the millionth GI to enjoy the Canteen, and consequently wins a date with Joan Leslie. The other GI, Sergeant Nolan (Dane Clark) gets to dance with Joan Crawford. Canteen founders Bette Davis and John Garfield give talks on the history of the Canteen. The soldiers enjoy a variety of musical numbers performed by a host of Hollywood stars, and also comedians, such as Jack Benny and his violin.

Cameo appearances
The film's setting is the Hollywood Canteen, a free entertainment club open to servicemen. The Canteen was created as a GI morale-booster by movie stars Bette Davis and John Garfield during World War II. Many of those cameoing in the film had previously volunteered to work there or provide entertainment. They include: The Andrews Sisters, Jack Benny, Joe E. Brown, Eddie Cantor, Kitty Carlisle, Jack Carson, Joan Crawford, Faye Emerson, Sydney Greenstreet, Alan Hale Sr., Paul Henreid, Joan Leslie, Peter Lorre, Ida Lupino, Dorothy Malone, Dennis Morgan, Janis Paige, Eleanor Parker, Roy Rogers (with Trigger), S.Z. Sakall, Zachary Scott, Alexis Smith, Barbara Stanwyck, Jane Wyman, and Jimmy Dorsey.

The Golden Gate Quartet, an all-black quartet, make a unique appearance. They had appeared at President Franklin D. Roosevelt's third inauguration—"firsts" for black performers—as well as in period movies.

Another cameo shows Joan McCracken straight from the musical Oklahoma! in a strong dance number reminiscent of her later dance in Good News.

The East Coast counterpart was the Stage Door Canteen, also celebrated in a 1943 film.

Musical numbers 

 "Hollywood Canteen" – sung by the Andrews Sisters behind titles.
 "What Are You Doin' the Rest of Your Life" by Ted Koehler and Burton Lane – sung and danced by Jack Carson and Jane Wyman with Jimmy Dorsey and his Orchestra.
 "The General Jumped at Dawn" by Jimmy Mundy – sung by Golden Gate Quartet.
 "We're Having a Baby" by Vernon Duke and Harold Adamson – sung by Eddie Cantor and Nora Martin with Jimmy Dorsey and his Orchestra.
 "Tumblin' Tumbleweeds" – sung by the Sons of the Pioneers.
 "Don't Fence Me In" by Cole Porter – sung by Roy Rogers with the Sons of the Pioneers.
 "Gettin' Corns For My Country" – sung by the Andrews Sisters with Jimmy Dorsey and his Orchestra.
 "Don't Fence Me In" (reprise) – sung by Roy Rogers and later by the Andrews Sisters with Jimmy Dorsey and his Orchestra.
 "You Can Always Tell a Yank" by Yip Harburg and Burton Lane – sung by Dennis Morgan and Chorus with Jimmy Dorsey and his Orchestra, then sung by Joe E. Brown with Chorus.
 "Sweet Dreams, Sweetheart" – sung by Joan Leslie (dubbed by Sally Sweetland) and Chorus.
 "Ballet in Jive" – danced by Joan McCracken and Chorus.
 "The Bee" by François Schubert – played by Joseph Szigeti.
 "The Souvenir" – played by Joseph Szigeti and Jack Benny.
 "Voodoo Moon" – played by Carmen Cavallaro and his Orchestra.
 "Dance" – danced by Antonio and Rosario.
 "Sweet Dreams, Sweetheart" (reprise) – sung by Kitty Carlisle.

Production 
Production on the film began in 1943, before being halted due to salary disputes involving the Screen Actors Guild and Warner Bros over the amount major stars would be paid even for brief cameos in the film. Filming locations included the Sunset Strip, Bel-Air Estates, and Veterans Administration Hospital. New recording equipments developed by Warner Bros, including a cueing device, were first used in this film.

Reception
The film received mixed reviews from critics. Variety noted "There isn't a marquee big enough to hold all the names in this one, so how can it miss? Besides, it's basically solid. It has story, cohesion, and heart." Kate Cameron of the Daily News commented "It is an elaborate show, but it is presented by author-director Delmar Daves in such a patronizing manner as to make one blush for its complete lack of reserve in singing the praises of Hollywood."

Box office
Despite some negative reviews, Hollywood Canteen was well received by audiences and became Warner Bros.' most successful release of 1944. The studio donated 40% of ticket sales to the real Hollywood Canteen.

According to Warner Bros. records, the movie earned $3,831,000 in the U.S. and $1,621,000 elsewhere.

Awards and nominations
Hollywood Canteen received Academy Award nominations for Best Original Song: "Sweet Dreams, Sweetheart", by M. K. Jerome and Ted Koehler; Scoring of a Musical Picture: Ray Heindorf; and Sound Recording: Nathan Levinson.

See also
List of American films of 1944
 This Is the Army
 Star Spangled Rhythm
 Private Buckaroo
 Follow the Boys
 Stage Door Canteen
 Thank Your Lucky Stars
 Thousands Cheer
 Cowboy Canteen
 Show Business at War

References

External links
 
 
 
 
 

1940s romantic musical films
1944 films
1944 musical comedy films
1944 romantic comedy films
American black-and-white films
American musical comedy films
American romantic comedy films
American romantic musical films
1940s English-language films
Films directed by Delmer Daves
Films scored by Ray Heindorf
Films set in Los Angeles
Films set on the home front during World War II
Warner Bros. films
1940s American films